Helen Czerski is a British physicist and oceanographer and television presenter. She is a research fellow in the department of mechanical engineering at University College London. She was previously at the Institute for Sound and Vibration Research at the University of Southampton.

Early life and education
Czerski was brought up in Altrincham, Greater Manchester, and educated at Altrincham Grammar School for Girls. She graduated from the University of Cambridge where she was a student at Churchill College, Cambridge, with degrees Master of Arts and Master of Science in Natural Sciences (Physics) and a PhD in experimental explosives physics, particularly Research Department Explosive (RDX).

Career

Czerski is a regular science presenter for the BBC.  Her programmes have included:

Orbit: Earth's Extraordinary Journey, a three-part series on BBC Two, March 2012, co-presented with Kate Humble.
Operation Iceberg, a two-part series on BBC Two, October 2012.
The Transit of Venus, BBC Two, June 2012, Horizon.
Stargazing Challenges, BBC Two.
Dara Ó Briain's Science Club, BBC Two.
The Secret Life of the Sun, BBC Two, July 2013.
Pop! The Science of Bubbles, BBC Four, April 2013.
The £10 Million Challenge, a Horizon which launched the Longitude Prize 2014.
What's Wrong with Our Weather?, July 2014, Horizon, co-presented with meteorologist John Hammond, which examined the possible causes of Britain's recent extreme weather and what connects all the recent extreme winters.
Super Senses: The Secret Power of Animals, August 2014, a three-part series for BBC Two.
Colour: The Spectrum of Science, November 2015, a three-part series for BBC Four on the 15 colours that tell the story of the Earth, life and scientific discovery.
Dangerous Earth, November 2016, a six-part series for the BBC showing how new camera technology is revealing the inner workings of the Earth's most spectacular natural wonders.
The Infinite Monkey Cage - "The Science of Everyday Life", BBC Radio 4, 16 January 2017. 
Sound Waves: The Symphony of Physics, March 2017, a two-part series.
From Ice to Fire: The Incredible Science of Temperature, February 2018, a three-part series.
WMG Future Batteries | Fully Charged, 20 February 2019.
Ocean Autopsy: The Secret Story of Our Seas, June 2020, a 90-minute film.
Royal Institution Christmas Lectures - Planet Earth: A user's guide, December 2020, BBC Four series

She has also appeared on The Museum of Curiosity (BBC Radio 4) and is an occasional presenter of the web TV and podcast show Fully Charged. Czerski is a regular contributor to BBC Focus in the column "Everyday Science" and the Wall Street Journal in the column "Everyday Physics".

Czerski has a regular column in BBC Focus magazine and was shortlisted in for columnist of the year at the 2014 PPA Awards.

Awards 

In 2018 Czerski won the William Thomson, Lord Kelvin Medal and Prize from the Institute of Physics for her contributions to championing the physics of everyday life to a worldwide audience of millions through TV programmes, a popular science book, newspaper columns, and public talks.

Research
Czerski's research focuses on temperature, ocean bubbles, bubble acoustics, air-sea gas transfer and ocean bubble optics.

Publications
Storm in a Teacup: The Physics of Everyday Life. Bantam Press, 2016.  whose version in Italian translation won the third edition (2018) of Premio ASIMOV (Asimov award) for the best book in scientific dissemination published in Italy.

References

External links

1978 births
Living people
Academics of the University of Southampton
Academics of University College London
Alumni of Churchill College, Cambridge
English people of Polish descent
English physicists
Scientists from Manchester
English women physicists
English television presenters
People from Manchester